The Charlotte Express was a professional ultimate team from Charlotte, North Carolina playing in the South Division of the American Ultimate Disc League.  The team was founded in 2015 and played its home games at the Irwin Belk Complex at Johnson C. Smith University in Charlotte, North Carolina. The team announced it would fold after the 2016 season.

References

Sports teams in Charlotte, North Carolina
Ultimate teams established in 2015
Ultimate (sport) teams
2015 establishments in North Carolina
Ultimate teams disestablished in 2016
2016 disestablishments in North Carolina